The 1926–27 Niagara Purple Eagles men's basketball team represented Niagara University during the 1926–27 NCAA college men's basketball season. The head coach was Peter Dwyer, coaching his fourth season with the Purple Eagles.

Schedule

|-

References

Niagara Purple Eagles men's basketball seasons
Niagara
Niagara Purple Eagles men's basketball
Niagara Purple Eagles men's basketball